The Order of Friars Minor Capuchin (postnominal abbr. O.F.M. Cap.) is a religious order of Franciscan friars within the Catholic Church, one of Three "First Orders" that reformed from the Franciscan Friars Minor Observant (OFM Obs., now OFM), the other being the Conventuals (OFM Conv.). Franciscans reformed as Capuchins in 1525 with the purpose of regaining the original Habit (Tunic) of St. Francis of Assisi and also for returning to a stricter observance of the rule established by Francis of Assisi in 1209.

History

Origins 

The Order arose in 1525 when Matteo da Bascio, an Observant Franciscan friar native to the Italian region of Marche, said he had been inspired by God with the idea that the manner of life led by the friars of his day was not the one which their founder, St. Francis of Assisi, had envisaged. He sought to return to the primitive way of life of solitude and penance, as practised by the founder of their Order.

His religious superiors tried to suppress these innovations and Friar Matteo and his first companions were forced into hiding from Church authorities, who sought to arrest them for having abandoned their religious duties. They were given refuge by the Camaldolese monks, in gratitude for which they later adopted the hood (or cappuccio, capuche) worn by that Order—which was the mark of a hermit in that region of Italy—and the practise of wearing a beard. The popular name of their Order originates from this feature of their religious habit.

In 1528, Friar Matteo obtained the approval of Pope Clement VII and was given permission to live as a hermit and to go about everywhere preaching to the poor. These permissions were not only for himself, but for all such as might join him in the attempt to restore the most literal observance possible of the Rule of St. Francis. Matteo and the original band were soon joined by others. Matteo and his companions were formed into a separate province, called the Hermit Friars Minor, as a branch of the Conventual Franciscans, but with a Vicar Provincial of their own, subject to the jurisdiction of the Minister General of the Conventuals. The Observants, the other branch of the Franciscan Order at that time, continued to oppose the movement.

Rules of the Order
In 1529, they had four houses and held their first General Chapter, at which their particular rules were drawn up. The eremitical idea was abandoned, but the life was to be one of extreme austerity, simplicity and poverty—in all things as near an approach to St Francis' ideals as was practicable. Neither the monasteries nor the Province should possess anything, nor were any loopholes left for evading this law. No large provision against temporal wants should be made, and the supplies in the house should never exceed what was necessary for a few days. Everything was to be obtained by begging, and the friars were not allowed even to touch money.

The communities were to be small, eight being fixed as the normal number and twelve as the limit. In furniture and clothing extreme simplicity was enjoined and the friars were discalced, required to go bare-footed—without even sandals. Like the Observants, the Capuchins wore a brown habit but of most simple form, i.e. only a tunic, with the distinctive large, pointed hood reaching to the waist attached to it, girdled by the traditional woolen cord with three knots. By visual analogy, the Capuchin monkey and the cappuccino style of coffee are both named after the shade of brown used for their habit.

Besides the canonical choral celebration of the Divine Office, a portion of which was recited at midnight, there were two hours of private prayer daily. The fasts and disciplines were rigorous and frequent. Their main external work was preaching and spiritual ministrations among the poor. In theology the Capuchins abandoned the later Franciscan School of Scotus and returned to the earlier school of St. Bonaventure.

Early setbacks
At the outset of its history, the Capuchins underwent a series of severe blows. Two of the founders left it: Matteo Serafini of Bascio (Matteo Bassi) returning to the Observants, while his first companion, on being replaced in the office of Vicar Provincial, became so insubordinate that he had to be expelled from the Order. Even more scandalously, the third Vicar General, Bernardino Ochino, left the Catholic faith in 1543 after fleeing to Switzerland, where he was welcomed by John Calvin, became a Calvinist pastor in Zürich, and married. Years later, claims that he had written in favor of polygamy and Unitarianism caused him to be exiled from that city and he fled again, first to Poland and then to Moravia, where he died.

As a result, the whole province came under the suspicion of heretical tendencies and the Pope resolved to suppress it. He was dissuaded with difficulty, but the Capuchins were forbidden to preach.

Expansion
Despite earlier setbacks, the authorities were eventually satisfied as to the soundness of the general body of Capuchin friars and the permission to preach was restored. The movement then began to multiply rapidly, and by the end of the 16th century the Capuchins had spread all over the Catholic parts of Europe, so that in 1619 they were freed from their dependence on the Conventual Franciscans and became an independent Order. They are said to have had at that time 1500 houses divided into fifty provinces. They were one of the chief tools in the Catholic Counter-reformation, the aim of the order being to work among the poor, impressing the minds of the common people by the poverty and austerity of their life, and sometimes with sensationalist preaching such as their use of the supposedly possessed Marthe Brossier to arouse Paris against the Huguenots.

The activities of the Capuchins were not confined to Europe. From an early date they undertook missions to non-Catholics in America, Asia and Africa, and a College was founded in Rome for the purpose of preparing their members for foreign missions. Due to this strong missionary thrust, a large number of Capuchins have suffered martyrdom over the centuries. Activity in Europe and elsewhere continued until the close of the 18th century, when the number of Capuchin friars was estimated at 31,000.

Cimitero dei Cappuccini: The Capuchin Crypt

The crypt is located just under the Church of Santa Maria della Concezione in Rome, a church commissioned by Pope Urban VIII in 1626. The pope's brother, Cardinal Antonio Barberini, who was of the Capuchin Order, in 1631 ordered the remains of thousands of Capuchin friars exhumed and transferred from the friary on the Via dei Lucchesi to the crypt. The bones were arranged along the walls in varied designs, and the friars began to bury their own dead here, as well as the bodies of poor Romans whose tomb was under the floor of the present Mass chapel. Here the Capuchins would come to pray and reflect each evening before retiring for the night.

The crypt, or ossuary, now contains the remains of 4,000 friars buried between 1500–1870, during which time the Roman Catholic Church permitted burial in and under churches. The underground crypt is divided into five chapels, lit only by dim natural light seeping in through cracks, and small fluorescent lamps. The crypt walls are decorated extensively with the remains, depicting various religious themes. Some of the skeletons are intact and draped with Franciscan habits, but for the most part, individual bones are used to create the elaborate ornamental designs.

A plaque in the chapel reads:

What you are now, we used to be.What we are now, you will be.

Mark Twain visited the crypt in the summer of 1867, and begins Volume 2, Chapter 1, of The Innocents Abroad with five pages of his observations.

Modern era

Like all other Orders, the Capuchins suffered severely from the secularizations and revolutions of the end of the 18th century and the first half of the 19th; but they survived the strain, and during the latter part of the 19th century rapidly recovered ground. At the beginning of the 20th century there were fifty provinces with some 500 friaries and 300 hospices or lesser houses; and the number of Capuchin friars, including lay brothers, was reckoned at 9,500. The Capuchins still keep up their missionary work and have some 200 missionary stations in all parts of the world—notably India, Ethiopia, and parts of the former Ottoman Empire. Though "the poorest of all Orders", it has attracted into its ranks an extraordinary number of the highest nobility and even of royalty. The celebrated Theobald Mathew, the apostle of Temperance in Ireland, was a Capuchin friar.

In the Imperial Crypt, underneath the Church of the Capuchins in Vienna, over 140 members of the Habsburg dynasty are buried. The most recent burial in the crypt was in 2011 for Otto von Habsburg, the last crown prince of Austria-Hungary and eldest son of the last Austrian Emperor, the Blessed Charles of Austria.

, there were 10,480 Capuchins worldwide, of whom 7,070 were priests, living and working in 108 countries around the world: Africa: 1,357; South America: 1,657; North America: 664; Asia-Oceania: 2,339; Western Europe: 3,500; Central-Eastern Europe: 769. In Great Britain there are currently five Capuchin friaries, and eight in Ireland.

The worldwide head of the Order, called the Minister General, is currently Friar Roberto Genuin.

India

The Capuchin order, under the leadership of Italian Capuchin priest Giuseppe Maria Bernini, took part in the European colonization of India as missionaries and founded the community of Bettiah Christians. Bernini was invited by Maharaja Dhurup Singh of the Bettiah Raj, an appointment that was approved by Pope Benedict XIV on 1 May 1742.

United States

The United States has six provinces throughout the country. Together with the two provinces in Canada, the Province of Australia and the Custody of the Mariana Islands/Hawaii they form the North American-Pacific Capuchin Conference (NAPCC).

Foundation
The Province of St. Joseph, originally the Province of Calvary, headquartered in Detroit, Michigan, was one of the first two Capuchin Provinces to be established in the country in 1882. It was founded by Francis Haas (1826–1895) and Bonaventure Frey (1831–1912), two Swiss diocesan priests who arrived in the United States in September 1856, and were received into the then-Diocese of Milwaukee by Bishop John Henni, also a Swiss immigrant, and given charge of St. Nicholas Parish which they renamed Mount Calvary. They were later admitted to the Capuchin Order on December 2, 1857, by Antoine Gauchet of the Swiss Province who had been sent to admit them in order to establish the Order in the United States. The friars started St. Lawrence Seminary High School in 1861 at Mount Calvary, Wisconsin, a school that is still owned and operated by the Capuchin Order.

One of the friars of this province, Solanus Casey, was noted for the holiness of his life, serving as the porter of several Capuchin friaries both in Michigan and New York City for decades. As a miraculous healing attributed to him was approved by Pope Francis in mid-2017, he was beatified in Detroit at Ford Field on November 18, 2017. This is significant because Casey could become the first male American-born Saint in the history of the Catholic Church. He had previously been declared Venerable in 1995 by Pope John Paul II. His tomb is in St. Bonaventure Monastery in Detroit, and is visited by thousands every year.

, the province has 23 communities spread throughout the American Midwest, reaching from Michigan to Arizona. Additionally, there are friars of this province working in Central America, with a community serving in the Middle East.

Other jurisdictions

 St. Joseph or Calvary (1882), based in Detroit, Michigan, covering the upper Midwest, from Detroit to Montana and from which came Blessed Solanus Casey.
 St. Augustine (1882), based in Pittsburgh, Pennsylvania, to which Cardinal Sean O'Malley belongs.
 Stigmata (ca. 1925), based in Union City, New Jersey, founded by friars from the Tuscan region of Italy to minister to Italian immigrants, with 9 communities on the East Coast, primarily in New Jersey, with parishes also in the Bronx, Hendersonville, North Carolina, Wilmington, Delaware, and Fort Lauderdale, Florida. 
 St. Mary of New York and New England (1952), based in White Plains, New York, with 18 fraternities on the East Coast, from Vermont to Florida. They supervise the Custody of Japan and the Custody of Guam.
 St. Conrad or Mid-America (1977), based in Denver, Colorado, serving Illinois, Colorado, Kansas, Missouri and Texas, with missionaries in Papua New Guinea; a friar of this province, Charles J. Chaput, was installed as the Archbishop of Philadelphia on 8 September 2011.
 Our Lady of Angels (1979), Western America, based in Burlingame, California. Seven communities in California, with four communities in Mexico which became the Custody of St. Juan Diego in December 2011.
 Star of the Sea Custody (1982),  Hawaii and Guam, this division is dependent on St. Mary Province.

Capuchin Poor Clares 
The Capuchin Poor Clares are cloistered nuns of the Order of St. Clare, who form the female branch of the Capuchin Order. They were founded in 1538 in Naples by the Venerable Maria Laurentia Longo, who was Abbess of the Poor Clare monastery of that city. She and the other nuns of that community embraced the then-new Capuchin reform movement, and so austere was the life that they were called "Sisters of Suffering". The Order soon spread to France, Spain and beyond. They live according to the same rules and regulations as the Capuchin friars, and are held as members of the friars' provinces.

In the United States, as of 2012, there are five monasteries of this Order. There are about 50 nuns in these communities, which are located in: Denver and Pueblo in Colorado, Alamo and Amarillo (the first, founded 1981) in Texas, and Wilmington, Delaware. The monasteries were almost all founded from Mexico, where there are some 1,350 Capuchin nuns in 73 monasteries. The monastery in Pueblo is a foundation of the monastery in Amarillo. Together they form the Federation of Our Lady of the Angels.

Appearance
The Capuchins are unique for a Catholic religious order in that the growing of natural, untrimmed beards features as part of its first Constitution, which states as the reason, the beard is "manly, austere, natural, an imitation of Christ and the saints of our Order, and despised." This makes the Capuchin friars stand out in particular from the secular clergy of the Latin Church, who have no rule on such matters. In more recent times, since the Second Vatican Council, the beard has no longer been mandatory but is still common. Like other Franciscans, the friars wear a plain brown tunic with a hood, a cord fastened around the waist, and sandals (or shoes).

Saints and Blesseds

Saints

Blesseds

Capuchin Poor Clares

 Maria Angela Astorch
 Florida Cevoli
 Veronica Giuliani

Other notable Capuchins

 Jeremiah Benettis, 18th-century Italian writer
 Cesare Bonizzi, heavy-metal band leader and singer
 Raniero Cantalamessa, author, speaker, and Preacher to the Papal Household
 Charles J. Chaput, Archbishop of Philadelphia (2011–2020), Archbishop of Denver (1997–2011)
 Sebastian Englert, friar, archaeologist and ethnographer of Easter Island (1888–1969)
 Patri Fidiel, Maltese poet
 Henri de Grèzes, religious historian and writer
 Seán Patrick O'Malley, Cardinal, Archbishop of Boston (2003–present)
 Vinkenti Peev, Bulgarian priest
 Lucian Pulvermacher, schismatic sedevacantist
 Antonio de Sedella, Chief of the Spanish Inquisition in Louisiana (1788), rector of St. Louis Cathedral (1795–1829)
 Emerich Sinelli, Prince-Bishop of Vienna (1681–85)
 Yannis Spiteris, Archbishop of Corfu (2003–present)
 Dávid Bartimej Tencer, Bishop of Reykjavik (2015–present)
 François Leclerc du Tremblay, friar and politician referred to as "The Grey Eminence" (1577–1638)

References

Citations

Sources
 There does not appear to be any modern general history of the Capuchin order as a whole, though there are histories of various provinces and of the foreign missions. The references to this literature can be found in the article "Kapuzinerorden" in Wetzer und Welte, Kirchenlexicon (2nd ed.), a general sketch on the subject.
 Shorter sketches, with the needful references, are given in Max Heimbucher, Orden und Kongregationen (1896), i. §4 and in Herzog-Hauck, Realencyklopedie (3rd ed.), art. "Kapuziner."
 Helyot's Hist. des ordres religieux (1792), vii. c. 24 and c. 27, gives an account of the Capuchins up to the end of the 17th century.

External links 

 Ordo Fratrum Minorum Capuccinorum, official website of international Religious Order
 Capuchins in Canada – Mary, Mother of the Good Shepherd Province, official website
 Capuchins of Ireland – Province of St. Patrick and St. Francis, official website
 Capuchins in Great Britain – Province of Our Lady Assumed Into Heaven and St. Lawrence of Brindisi
 Capuchin Franciscan Order – Our Lady of Angels Province, official website of Capuchin Franciscan Order in Western America
 The Capuchin-Franciscan Province of St. Joseph (Mid-West USA), official website
 Province of St. Joseph, official website
 Province of St. Conrad, official website
  Province of the Sacred Stigmata of St. Francis (New Jersey and Southeastern US), official website
 The Capuchin-Franciscans of the Province of Saint Augustine, official website
 

 
Religious organizations established in the 1520s
1520s establishments in the Papal States
Catholic religious orders established in the 16th century